The 1969 California Angels season was a season in American baseball. In the first season following the split of the American League into two divisions, the Angels finished third in the newly established American League West Division with a record of 71 wins and 91 losses.

Offseason 
 October 8, 1968: Eddie Fisher was traded by the Cleveland Indians to the California Angels for Jack Hamilton.
 October 15, 1968: 1968 MLB expansion draft
Paul Schaal was drafted from the Angels by the Kansas City Royals with the 27th pick.
Steve Hovley was drafted from the Angels by the Seattle Pilots with the 35th pick.
 November 6, 1968: Rubén Amaro Sr. was purchased by the Angels from the New York Yankees.
 December 2, 1968: Pedro Borbón was drafted by the Angels from the St. Louis Cardinals in the 1968 rule 5 draft.
 December 12, 1968: Ed Kirkpatrick and Dennis Paepke were traded by the Angels to the Kansas City Royals for Hoyt Wilhelm.

Regular season

Season standings

Record vs. opponents

Notable transactions 
 April 3, 1969: Bo Belinsky was purchased by the Angels from the St. Louis Cardinals.
 May 14, 1969: Bobby Knoop was traded by the Angels to the Chicago White Sox for Sandy Alomar Sr. and Bob Priddy.
 June 5, 1969: Rudy Meoli was drafted by the Angels in the 4th round of the 1969 Major League Baseball draft. Player signed June 13, 1969.
 June 15, 1969: Tom Satriano was traded by the Angels to the Boston Red Sox for Joe Azcue.
 July 26, 1969: Billy Cowan was purchased by the Angels from the New York Yankees.
 July 30, 1969: Bo Belinsky was purchased from the Angels by the Pittsburgh Pirates.
 September 8, 1969: Hoyt Wilhelm and Bob Priddy were traded by the Angels to the Atlanta Braves for Mickey Rivers and Clint Compton.

Roster

Player stats

Batting

Starters by position 
Note: Pos = Position; G = Games played; AB = At bats; H = Hits; Avg. = Batting average; HR = Home runs; RBI = Runs batted in

Other batters 
Note: G = Games played; AB = At bats; H = Hits; Avg. = Batting average; HR = Home runs; RBI = Runs batted in

Pitching

Starting pitchers 
Note: G = Games pitched; IP = Innings pitched; W = Wins; L = Losses; ERA = Earned run average; SO = Strikeouts

Other pitchers 
Note: G = Games pitched; IP = Innings pitched; W = Wins; L = Losses; ERA = Earned run average; SO = Strikeouts

Relief pitchers 
Note: G = Games pitched; W = Wins; L = Losses; SV = Saves; ERA = Earned run average; SO = Strikeouts

Farm system

Notes

References 
1969 California Angels team at Baseball Reference
1969 California Angels team page at www.baseball-almanac.com

Los Angeles Angels seasons
California Angels season
Los